The Guangzhou Gymnasium is an indoor arena in Guangzhou. The arena is used as a concert venue and for sporting events such as arena football, basketball, badminton and table tennis. It was constructed between 11 February 1999 and opened on 30 June 2001, with a seating capacity of 10,000. It was designed by Paul Andreu.

Notable events
 2008 World Team Table Tennis Championships
 2009 Sudirman Cup
 2010 Asian Games
 2 July 2011: Jolin Tsai《Myself World Tour》 "蔡依林 Myself世界巡迴演唱會"
 2 March 2012: Greatest Hits Tour - Westlife
 30 June 2012: 2012 Shinhwa Grand Tour in China: The Return - the comeback concert of South Korean boy band Shinhwa, after a four-year hiatus due to mandatory military service.
 20 April 2013: Show Lo's Show 2013 《Over the limit》 World Live Tour "羅志祥 無極限 演唱會"
 18 June 2016: Got7 《Fly World Tour》
 19 October 2017 – 22 October 2017: Quarterfinals for the 2017 League of Legends World championship
 2019 FIBA World Cup Group C (Spain, Iran, Puerto Rico and Tunisia)

See also
List of indoor arenas in China

References

External links

 Arena information

Sports venues in Guangzhou
Indoor arenas in China
Baiyun District, Guangzhou
Venues of the 2010 Asian Games
2001 establishments in China
Esports venues in China